Selected Letters I, 1911-1924 is a collection of letters by H. P. Lovecraft. It was released in 1964 by Arkham House in an edition of 2,504 copies.  It is the first of a five volume series of collections of Lovecraft's letters and includes a preface by August Derleth and Donald Wandrei. 

The five-volume series represents only a fragment of Lovecraft's correspondence.

Contents

Selected Letters I, 1911-1924 includes letters to:

 Rheinhart Kleiner
 Maurice W. Moe
 Frank Belknap Long
 Clark Ashton Smith
 Lillian D. Clark

Reprints

Sauk City, WI: Arkham House, 1975 (2nd printing of 3,045 copies).

References

1964 non-fiction books
Arkham House books
Books published posthumously
Collections of letters
Non-fiction books by H. P. Lovecraft